was the second vessel in the two-vessel  of heavy cruisers in the Imperial Japanese Navy. The ship was named after Mount Kinugasa, located in Yokosuka, Kanagawa, Japan.

Background
However, design issues with the Furutakas resulted in modifications including twin turrets and an aircraft catapult. These modifications created yet more weight to an already top-heavy design, causing stability problems. Nevertheless, Kinugasa played an important role in the opening stages of World War II.

Service career

Pre-World War II
Kinugasa was completed on 30 September 1927 at the Kawasaki shipyards in Kobe. Her early service was as flagship of the Fifth Squadron (Sentai), and she operated for virtually her entire career with that unit and the Sixth and Seventh Squadrons. In 1928, she became the first Japanese combat ship to carry an aircraft catapult.

During a training exercise on 11 July 1929, the Japanese submarine I-55 accidentally collided with Kinugasa while using Kinugasa as a target. I-55 suffered damage to her bow plating in the collision.

Kinugasa served off the China coast in 1928–1929 and on several occasions during the 1930s. Placed in reserve in September 1937, Kinugasa was extensively modernized at the Sasebo Navy Yard and not recommissioned until the end of October 1940.

World War II
In 1941, Kinugasa was assigned to Cruiser Division 6 (CruDiv6), as flagship of Rear Admiral Aritomo Goto as part of the First Fleet under overall command of Vice Admiral Takasu Shiro. At the time of the attack on Pearl Harbor, CruDiv6 was engaged in the invasion of Guam, following which it participated in the second invasion of Wake Island.

From January–May 1942, Kinugasa was based out of Truk, in the Caroline Islands where it provided protection for the landings of Japanese troops in the Solomon Islands and New Guinea at Rabaul, Kavieng, Buka, Shortland, Kieta, Manus Island, Admiralty Islands and Tulagi.

Battle of Coral Sea

Furutaka and Kinugasa, undamaged in the battle, escorted Shōkaku back to Truk.

Kinugasa was withdrawn to Japan in June 1942 for repairs, and returned to Truk by 4 July. Following the major reorganization of 14 July 1942, Kinugasa came under the newly created Eighth Fleet under Vice Admiral Gunichi Mikawa, based at Rabaul.

The Battle of Savo Island
At about 23:00, Chōkai, Furutaka and Kako all launched their reconnaissance floatplanes. The circling floatplanes dropped flares illuminating the targets and all the Japanese ships opened fire. On the Japanese side, Chōkai was hit three times, Kinugasa twice (once in her No. 1 Engine Room by an 8-inch shell from Vincennes that did not explode but caused some damage, killed one man and wounded another, and one in a storeroom aft that was flooded by a 5-inch shell from Patterson), Aoba once, and Furutaka was not damaged.

The heavily laden American invasion transports off Guadalcanal were unprotected, but Admiral Mikawa, unaware that Admiral Fletcher had withdrawn his aircraft carriers covering the invasion, feared an air attack at daybreak and ordered a retirement. Captain Sawa of Kinugasa, frustrated, launched a spread of torpedoes from Kinugasas starboard tubes at the Allied transports  distant, but all missed. The following day as CruDiv6 approached Kavieng, Kako was torpedoed and sunk by the US submarine .

Battle of Cape Esperance
At the Battle of Cape Esperance on 11 October 1942, CruDiv 6's (Aoba, Furutaka and Kinugasa), and destroyers  and  departed Shortland to provide cover for a troop reinforcement convoy by shelling Henderson Field on Guadalcanal.

 
At 22:35, Helenas radar spotted the Japanese fleet, and the Americans successfully crossed the Japanese "T". Both fleets opened fire, but Admiral Goto, thinking that he was under friendly fire, ordered a 180-degree turn that exposed each of his ships to the American broadsides.

Aoba was damaged heavily, and Admiral Goto was mortally wounded.

Kinugasa straddled Boise and Salt Lake City with 8-inch salvos, knocking out Boises No. 1 and 2 turrets. Kinugasa sustained four hits in the engagement. The following morning, Kinugasa was attacked but not damaged by five American planes, and then returned to Shortland.

Just a few days later, on the night of 14/15 October 1942, Kinugasa returned and together with heavy cruiser  bombarded Henderson Field with a total of 752 8-inch shells. This followed the bombardment from battleships  and  the night before and preceded the bombardment by the heavy cruisers  and  the following night.

Naval Battle of Guadalcanal

From 24–26 October and 1–5 November, Kinugasa and Chōkai provided cover for replacement convoys of troops and equipment to bolster Japanese defenses at Guadalcanal. At 09:36, a 500-pound bomb hit Kinugasas  machine gun mount in front of the bridge, starting a fire in the forward gasoline storage area. Captain Sawa and his executive officer were killed by the bomb, and Kinugasa gradually began to list to port. Near-misses caused additional fires and flooding and a second attack by 17 more Dauntlesses knocked out Kinugasas engines and rudder and opened more compartments to the sea.

IJNS Kinugasa was removed from the Navy list on 15 December 1942.

References

Sources

External links
  
Tabular record:  CombinedFleet.com: Kinugasa history (Retrieved 4 April 2016.)
Gallery: US Navy Historical Center 

Aoba-class cruisers
Ships built by Kawasaki Heavy Industries
1926 ships
Maritime incidents in 1929
World War II cruisers of Japan
Shipwrecks in Ironbottom Sound
Cruisers sunk by aircraft
Maritime incidents in November 1942
Ships sunk by US aircraft